Yanda Pyissi (also spelled Rantapyissi;  1240s – 1284) was a minister in the service of King Narathihapate of the Pagan Dynasty of Burma (Myanmar). He was also a general in the Royal Burmese Army under the command of his elder brother Ananda Pyissi. Together they unsuccessfully fought against the first two Mongol invasions (1277–85). Ava kings from Mohnyin Thado to Narapati II, and all Konbaung kings were descended from him.

Early life
He was born Ot-Hla Nge (အုတ်လှငယ်) c. early 1240s to a senior official family in Pagan (Bagan). His father was Yazathingyan, then a minister (အမတ်) at the Pagan court, and his mother may have been Saw Khin Htut, a daughter of King Kyaswa of Pagan. He had an elder brother Ot-Hla Gyi, and two younger sisters Saw San and Saw Soe. The family grew up in Pagan where his father eventually rose to be the chief minister by 1248.

Career

He and his elder brother both followed his father's footsteps, and by the late 1250s had entered the royal service. The first mention of Ot-Hla Nge in the Burmese chronicles came in 1258 when he was sent by the young king Narathihapate to the front to Missagiri (in present-day Rakhine State) where the army had been trying to put down a rebellion, with an order to execute Thray Pyissapate, the commander of the operation, for his failure to defeat the rebellion. Fortunately for Thray Pyissapate, Ot-Hla Nge was intercepted midway by his father, who was on his way back from Martaban (Mottama), having put down a rebellion there.

In 1259–60, both brothers accompanied their father, then commander-in-chief, on the second Missagiri campaign (in present-day Rakhine State). The campaign ended Missagiri's two-year-old rebellion, and Yazathingyan sent Ot-Hla Nge to Pagan to inform the king of the news of victory. He rushed back to Pagan but he was promptly arrested by the capital guards on the order of the king. The impetuous young king, who had been anxiously waiting for news from the front, initially believed Ot-Hla Nge had fled the battlefield, and returned with the bad news. But Ot-Hla Nge carried the news of the victory, and his life was spared. But their father died on the return trip. Both brothers both vied to succeed their father's title Yazathingyan. The king refused but allowed them to serve at his court with the titles of Ananda Pyissi and Yanda Pyissi, respectively.

Now known as Yanda Pyissi, he did not seem escape his brother's shadow. Ananda Pyissi rose to be a minister, by perhaps as early as 1261, and eventually the chief minister by 1271. By the 1270s, Yanda Pyissi had joined as one of the ministers of the Pagan court, which was headed by Ananda Pyissi. Starting from 1271, the court faced repeated demands of the Mongol Empire to submit, which the Burmese king rejected. In 1275, the Yunnan government recommended war to the emperor, who agreed to the recommendation by 1277.

Yanda Pyissi twice went to the front in northern Pagan territories (present-day Dehong Dai and Jingpo Autonomous Prefecture in Yunnan, and Kachin State) in 1277 and 1283–84. In both campaigns, he was the deputy of his brother, the commander-in-chief of the Royal Burmese armed forces. Both campaigns ended in failure. By 1285, the Mongol forces had occupied as far south as Tagaung.

The 1283–84 campaign was the last known record of Yanda Pyissi. Chronicles say that Ananda Pyissi died in action in early 1284 at Tagaung, which is incorrect according to a 1285 stone inscription, which states that Burmese generals Ananda Pyissi and Maha Bo negotiated for peace with the victorious Mongol forces in 1285. It appears that Maha Bo had become Ananda Pyissi's deputy in place of Yanda Pyissi, who may have died in action. If it was Yanda Pyissi that died in the battle of Tagaung, then Yanda Pyissi died in early February 1284 (Tagaung fell on 5 February 1284).

Family
According to the Alaungpaya Ayedawbon chronicle, Yanda Pyissi through his daughter Khin Hpone was an ancestor of Ava kings from Mohnyin Thado to Narapati II and all Konbaung kings.

Notes

References

Bibliography
 
 
 
 
 
 
 

Ministers of Pagan dynasty
Burmese generals
13th-century Burmese people